Gustavo Andrés Rojas Calderón (born February 6, 1988) is a Colombian football defender, who currently plays for Bogotá F.C. in the Categoría Primera B. He has played for the U-20.

References

1988 births
Living people
Footballers from Bogotá
Colombian footballers
Millonarios F.C. players
Atlético Huila footballers
Bogotá FC footballers
Association football defenders